Geneva Business School is a private business school. It has campuses in Geneva (Switzerland), Barcelona and Madrid (Spain).

History

In 1995, the Institut de Formation de Gestionnaire de Patrimoine was founded in Geneva. In 2001, The University of Finance was created to provide education in International Banking and Finance to bankers and students. The Canton of Geneva asked the University of Finance to take over ownership of the bankrupt Geneva Business Institute in 2003, and was renamed Business and Management University Ltd.

In 2009, it was renamed Geneva Business School Ltd. In 2012, Geneva Business School opened a campus in Barcelona, Spain. In 2018, a second Spanish campus opened in Madrid.

Academic programs

Geneva Business School offers business programs at bachelor's, master's, and doctoral levels taught in English.

Programs include bachelor's degrees in Management with different specializations such as International Management, Digital Marketing, Entrepreneurship, International Relations, Sports Management, and International Finance.

Other programs offered at Geneva Business School include the Master's Degree in International Management, Master of Business Administration, and a Doctor of Business Administration (online), all with various specializations.

The school is partnered with Qualifi, allowing students to earn UK-based degrees as a top-up to their main degree. It is also partnered with Ubiqum for Web Development or Data Analytics & Machine Learning, with The International Center of European Football for a bachelor's degree in International Management to qualified football players, and with Barcelona International Water Polo Academy for bachelor's or master's degrees to students who pass high school.

Accreditation status 

All programs are accredited by the private programmatic agency International Assembly for Collegiate Business Education (IACBE).

Rankings

 GSB is ranked #52 out of 100 for top business schools worldwide and #2 in Switzerland (CEO World Magazine) - 2023
 Three times Awarded with Palmes of Excellence from Eduniversal International Scientific Committee
 EMEA Winner for Career Development at the Global Student Satisfaction Awards (Study Portals) - 2021

References

Business schools in Switzerland
Private schools in Switzerland
Companies based in Geneva
Privately held companies of Switzerland